Oana Bondar (née Herman, born 26 March 1983) is a Romanian female handballer who plays for CS Minaur Baia Mare.

Achievements
Liga Naţională:
Winner: 2014
Silver Medalist: 2013
Cupa României:
Winner: 2013, 2014
Supercupa României:
Winner: 2013

Personal life
Oana Bondar is married to former Romanian handballer Alin Bondar.

References

1983 births
Living people
Sportspeople from Cluj-Napoca
Romanian female handball players